Fahri Beqiri (born 1936) was an Albanian composer and professor at the University of Prishtina Department of Music.

Education
Beqiri was born in Yugoslavia and graduated composition from the University of Arts in Belgrade, Serbia, where he studied in the class of eminent Serbian composer Enriko Josif.

Compositions
Beqiri was considered to be one of the most important Yugoslav composers of Albanian ethnicity. He wrote compositions for symphony orchestra, choir, piano, clarinet, wind quintet, film theatre and ballet music, popular music, songs in folk tradition, popular music, many pieces for children, etc. His compositions were performed by eminent Serbian and Yugoslav musicians, including Milenko Stefanović, Ernest Ačkun, Miodrag Azanjac and Zorica Dimitrijević-Stošić.

Teaching activities
Beqiri taught Counterpoint at the University of Pristina Faculty of Arts for thirty years.

References 
 Fahri Beqiri's works, Retrieved on 11 August 2009
 Discography of Fahri Beqiri, Retrieved on 11 August 2009

Serbian composers
Yugoslav musicians
Academic staff of the University of Pristina
University of Arts in Belgrade alumni
Living people
1936 births
Yugoslav Albanians